Lott Cemetery is a cemetery in Waycross, Georgia that was established in 1877.  It occupies the block bounded by Butler, Tebeau, Quarterman, and Pendleton streets.  There were no areas designated for religious or ethnic groups.  African-American graves are along the western edge.  Several veterans of the Confederate States Army are also buried there.  It was the main cemetery in the city until the Oakland Cemetery was created in 1901 and the African-American Pine Hill Cemetery in 1907. There is a wide variety of funerary art in the cemetery.

It was added to the National Register of Historic Places in 2008.

Photos

References

External links
 

Cemeteries on the National Register of Historic Places in Georgia (U.S. state)
1877 establishments in Georgia (U.S. state)
Geography of Ware County, Georgia
National Register of Historic Places in Ware County, Georgia
African-American cemeteries